Kehdingen is the name of a landscape in the north German district of Stade on the Lower Elbe, the lower reaches of the River Elbe. It extends roughly from the mouth of the Oste in the north to the town of Stade in the south. Kehdingen is one of the Elbe Marshes. Until 1932 there was a Prussian district known as Land Kehdingen, and until 1975 there was an Evangelical-Lutheran deanery of Kehdingen with its base in Drochtersen, which was absorbed on 1 January 1976 into the deanery of Stade.

Important villages 
Bützfleth
Drochtersen
Freiburg/Elbe
Wischhafen

Islands 
Krautsand
Gauensieker Sand
Asseler Sand

External links 
 Web presence for Kehdingen
 Krimiland Kehdingen-Oste
 Ferienland Kehdingen

Regions of Lower Saxony
Stade (district)